Meta-scheduling or super scheduling is a computer software technique of optimizing computational workloads by combining an organization's multiple job schedulers into a single aggregated view, allowing batch jobs to be directed to the best location for execution.

Meta-Scheduling for MPSoCs 
Meta-scheduling technique is a solution for scheduling a set of dependent or independent faults with different scenarios that are mapping and modeling in an event-tree. It can be used as a dynamic or static scheduling method.

Scenario-Based Meta-Scheduling (SBMeS) for MPSoCs and NoCs 
Scenario-based and multi-mode approaches are essential techniques in embedded-systems, e.g., design space exploration for MPSoCs and reconfigurable systems.

Optimization techniques for the generation of schedule graphs supporting such a SBMeS approach have been developed and implemented. 

SBMeS  can promise better performance by reducing dynamic scheduling overhead and recovering from faults.

Implementations 
The following is a partial list of noteworthy open source and commercial meta-schedulers currently available.
 GridWay by the Globus Alliance
 Community Scheduler Framework by Platform Computing & Jilin University
 MP Synergy by United Devices
 Moab Cluster Suite and Maui Cluster scheduler from Adaptive Computing
 DIOGENES (DIstributed Optimal GENEtic algorithm for grid applications Scheduling, started project)
 SynfiniWay's meta-scheduler.
 MeS is designed to generate schedules for anticipated changes of scenarios by Dr.-Ing. Babak Sorkhpour & Prof. Dr.-Ing.Roman Obermaisser in Chair for Embedded Systems in university of Siegen for Energy-Efficient, Robust and Adaptive Time-Triggered Systems (multi-core architectures with Networks-on-chip).

References 

 

 B. Sorkhpour and R. Obermaisser. "MeSViz: Visualizing Scenario-based Meta-Schedules for Adaptive Time-Triggered Systems.". in AmE 2018-Automotive meets Electronics; 9th GMM-Symposium, 2018, pp. 1–6
 B. Sorkhpour, R. Obermaisser and A. Murshed, "Meta-Scheduling Techniques for Energy-Efficient, Robust and Adaptive Time-Triggered Systems," in Knowledge-Based Engineering and Innovation (KBEI), 2017 IEEE 4th International Conference on, Tehran, 2017.
B. Sorkhpour, O. Roman, and Y. Bebawy, Eds., Optimization of Frequency-Scaling in Time-Triggered Multi-Core Architectures using Scenario-Based Meta-Scheduling: “in AmE 2019-Automotive meets Electronics; 10th GMM-Symposium VDE, 2019
B. Sorkhpour. "Scenario-based meta-scheduling for energy-efficient, robust and adaptive time-triggered multi-core architectures", University of Siegen, Doctoral thesis, July 2019.

Grid computing

External links 

 Super Scheduler project by the Asia-Pacific Science Technology Center.
 Meta-Scheduling Techniques for Energy-Efficient by Dr.-Ing. Babak sorkhpour.
 Community Scheduler Framework by Platform Computing & Jilin University
 Adaptive Computing
 DIOGENES (DIstributed Optimal GENEtic algorithm for grid applications Scheduling)
 Prof. Dr.-Ing.Roman Obermaisser
 Chair for Embedded Systems